Hiram na Puso (International title: A Change of Heart / ) is a 2012 Philippine television drama series broadcast by GMA Network. Directed by Andoy Ranay and Roderick Lindayag, it stars Kris Bernal. It premiered on March 5, 2012 on the network's Afternoon Prime line up replacing Kokak. The series concluded on July 6, 2012 with a total of 88 episodes. It was replaced by Hindi Ka na Mag-iisa in its timeslot.

Cast and characters

Lead cast
 Kris Bernal as Lira Banaag

Supporting cast
 Mark Herras as Prince
 Gina Alajar as Zeny Banaag
 Gardo Versoza as Leo Saavedra
 Ayen Munji-Laurel as Roxanne Saavedra
 Bela Padilla as Vanessa Saavedra / Kara Banaag
 Polo Ravales as Dennis
 Krystal Reyes as Angeline Saavedra
 Candy Pangilinan as Becky
 Wynwyn Marquez as Jillian
 Ana Marin as Chona
 Marc Acueza as Choy

Guest cast
 Ehra Madrigal as young Becky
 Stef Prescott as young Zeny
 Renz Valerio as young Prince
 Angie Ferro as a patient

Ratings
According to AGB Nielsen Philippines' Mega Manila household television ratings, the pilot episode of Hiram na Puso earned a 6.6% rating. While the final episode scored a 20.7% rating.

Accolades

References

External links
 

2012 Philippine television series debuts
2012 Philippine television series endings
Filipino-language television shows
GMA Network drama series
Television shows set in the Philippines